Major General George A. White (18 July 1880 – 23 November 1941) was an American journalist, magazine editor, and senior officer of the Oregon National Guard, who helped organize The American Legion. He commanded the 41st Infantry Division, Oregon National Guard, from January 1930 until his death in November 1941.

Early life
George Ared White was born on July 18, 1880, in Saline County, Illinois. On August 1, 1895, he enlisted in the Utah National Guard as a musician. He was discharged in June 1898 in order to enlist in the U.S. Volunteers for the Spanish–American War. He remained in Federal service until discharged in December 1898. White re-enlisted in the Guard in 1899 was promoted to sergeant and later first sergeant before being discharged in 1903. He moved to Oregon, where he enlisted in the 3d Infantry, Oregon National Guard on August 4, 1907. The next day he was promoted to first lieutenant. White was promoted to Captain on March 21, 1911.

Military career

Mexican Border Service
White was appointed Adjutant General of Oregon on February 1, 1915. When the National Guard was Federalized for Mexican Border Service, he obtained a leave of absence in order to command a troop of Oregon cavalry. After service on the Mexican border from June 1916 to February 1917, White resumed his post in Oregon.

World War I
On March 23, 1917, the National Guard was mobilized. As Adjutant General of Oregon, White was involved in recruiting efforts to bring the State's units up to strength, and he directed the establishment of state machinery for conscription. He re-entered federal service on September 10, 1917, with the rank of major and assigned as Assistant Adjutant General of the 41st Division, a new division being organized from National Guard units from Oregon, Washington, Idaho, Montana and Wyoming.

White served in France from January 1918 to June 1919. Initially, he was with the 41st but subsequently posted to the General Headquarters, American Expeditionary Forces (A. E. F.). He was promoted to lieutenant colonel on November 13, 1918. For his services, White was appointed Knight of the French Order of the Black Star.

Later years
White was separated from Federal service on July 23, 1919, resumed his duties as Adjutant General on April 15, 1920. His first task was the reconstruction of the Oregon national Guard, in which he was promoted to colonel on June 23, 1920. He assumed command of the 82nd Infantry Brigade, a brigade composed of Oregon troops, the same day and was later promoted to brigadier general. White attended the Command and General Staff School from 1925 to 1926 and took part in training seminars organized by the War College in 1928. On January 3, 1930, he was promoted to major general and appointed to command the 41st Division.

The 41st Division's annual summer camp at Fort Lewis in June and July 1940 was extended from two weeks to three, and on September 16, 1940, with President Franklin D. Roosevelt's signing of the Selective Training and Service Act of 1940, the 41st Division was inducted into Federal service for one year. Selective service men began to arrive in February 1941. In May 1941, 41st Division moved to the Hunter Liggett Military Reservation where June war games pitted it against Major General Joseph Stilwell's 7th Infantry Division and the 40th Infantry Division. Large scale maneuvers continued in August on the Olympic Peninsula. George A. White would become Oregon's longest-serving adjutant general, having served from 1915-1918 and 1920-1941.Historical Outreach Foundation

The American Legion
White was one of 20 officers at the Allied Officers' Club, Rue Faubourg St. Honore, on February 16, 1919, who were credited with the founding of The American Legion. He subsequently became its first national vice commander. He founded The American Legion magazine and was its first editor. For his services to The American Legion, and for promoting friendship between the United States and France, he was awarded the French Grand Cross of the Legion of Honor on July 9, 1934. He also wrote several short stories for both pulp magazines and "slick" magazines, such as Adventure, Everybody's Magazine and The Saturday Evening Post.

Death
White became ill during the maneuvers at Hunter Liggett. He died at his home in Clackamas, Oregon, on November 23, 1941.

Honors
White's legacy included one of the National Guard's best-trained World War II era divisions. In his honor, Camp White was named after him in 1942.

See also
 List of members of the American Legion

References

Bibliography

External links 

 
 Maj. Gen. George A. White at The American Legion

1880 births
1941 deaths
20th-century American male writers
Adjutants General of Oregon
United States Army personnel of World War I
American magazine editors
American magazine founders
American military personnel of the Spanish–American War
Burials in Oregon
Grand Croix of the Légion d'honneur
Journalists from Illinois
Military personnel from Illinois
National Guard (United States) generals
Organization founders
People from Saline County, Illinois
Pulp fiction writers
United States Army Command and General Staff College alumni
United States Army War College alumni
20th-century American writers
United States Army generals of World War II
United States Army generals